Peter Østergaard Sørensen (born 24 March 1973) is a Danish football manager and former player. He was most recently the manager of Vejle Boldklub.

External links 
 Profil på FC Fredericia Profile
 DBU Profile

1973 births
Living people
People from Silkeborg
Association football midfielders
Danish men's footballers
Denmark international footballers
Denmark under-21 international footballers
Denmark youth international footballers
Silkeborg IF players
FC Groningen players
Malmö FF players
Hamarkameratene players
Allsvenskan players
Danish Superliga players
Eredivisie players
Eliteserien players
Expatriate footballers in the Netherlands
Expatriate footballers in Norway
Danish football managers
FC Fredericia managers
Aarhus Gymnastikforening managers
Silkeborg IF managers
Hobro IK managers
Vejle Boldklub managers
Danish 1st Division managers
Danish Superliga managers
Sportspeople from the Central Denmark Region